"Robarte un Beso" is a song by Colombian singers Carlos Vives and Sebastián Yatra from Vives' fifteenth studio album, Vives (2017). It was written by the two singers, and producers Mauricio Rengifo and Andres Torres. Regarding the track, Yatra said, "'Robarte un Beso' is a song that we did inspired by love, regaining, falling in love, it's never too late to tell that person we have next to us how much we love them." It was nominated for Song of the Year at the 2018 Latin Grammy Awards.

Music video
The music video was directed by Venezuelan director Daniel Duran. As of February 2020, the song's music video has over 1.3 billion views on YouTube.

Charts

Weekly charts

Year-end charts

Certifications

See also
List of Billboard number-one Latin songs of 2018

References

2017 singles
2017 songs
Carlos Vives songs
Sebastián Yatra songs
Songs written by Sebastián Yatra
Songs written by Carlos Vives
Sony Music Latin singles
Spanish-language songs
Songs written by Andrés Torres (producer)
Song recordings produced by Andrés Torres (producer)
Songs written by Mauricio Rengifo